Glenn Magnusson (born 5 July 1969) is a Swedish former professional road cyclist. He is most known for winning 3 stages of the Giro d'Italia. He also represented Sweden at the Olympics three times (1992, 1996, 2000).

Major results
Sources:

1987
 1st  Road race, National Junior Road Championships
1992
 2nd Duo Normand (with Jan Karlsson)
 9th Overall Tour of Sweden
1993
 1st Prologue Tour of Sweden
 Scandinavian road champion
 3rd Overall Tour de Berlin
 3rd Berliner Etappenfahrt
1995
 1st  Road race, National Road Championships
1996
 1st Stage 2 Giro d'Italia
 5th Overall Tour of Sweden
 10th Overall Tour de l'Ain
1st Stage 2
1997
 1st  Overall Tour de Normandie
1st Stage 4
 1st Stage 13 Giro d'Italia
 1st  Points classification Tour of Sweden
1st Stage 4a 
 2nd Road race, National Road Championships
 2nd Gran Premio Bruno Beghelli
 3rd Overall Giro di Puglia
 9th Road race, World Road Championships
1998
 1st Overall Giro di Puglia
1st Stage 4
 1st Tour du Lac Léman
 1st Stage 9 Giro d'Italia
 1st Stage 2 Niedersachsen-Rundfahrt
 1st Stages 3 & 6 Giro d'Abruzzo
 3rd Time trial, National Road Championships
 9th Overall Tour of Sweden
 9th Tour de Berne
2001
 1st  Points classification, Critérium du Dauphiné Libéré

Grand Tour general classification results timeline

References

External links

1969 births
Living people
Swedish male cyclists
Swedish Giro d'Italia stage winners
Olympic cyclists of Sweden
Cyclists at the 1992 Summer Olympics
Cyclists at the 1996 Summer Olympics
Cyclists at the 2000 Summer Olympics
20th-century Swedish people
21st-century Swedish people